Forth or FORTH may refer to:

Arts and entertainment 
 forth magazine, an Internet magazine
 Forth (album), by The Verve, 2008
 Forth, a 2011 album by Proto-Kaw
 Radio Forth, a group of independent local radio stations in Scotland

People
 Eric Forth (1944–2006), British politician
 Frederick Forth (1808–1876), British colonial administrator
 Hugh Forth (1610–1676), English politician
 Jane Forth (born 1953), American actress and model
 John Forth (c. 1769 – 1848), British jockey and racehorse trainer
 Lisette Denison Forth (c. 1786 – 1866), American slave who became a landowner and philanthropist
 Tasman Forth, pen name of Alexander Rud Mills (1885–1964), Australian Odinist

Places
 Forth, Tasmania, Australia
 Forth, Eckental, Germany
 Forth, South Lanarkshire, Scotland
 River Forth, in Scotland
 River Forth (Tasmania), Australia
 Forth (County Carlow barony), Ireland
 Forth (County Wexford barony), Ireland
 Forth (Edinburgh ward), Scotland

Ships
 , the name of several ships of the Royal Navy
 , a sailing ship built at Calcutta, British India
 , a sailing ship built at Leith, Scotland

Other uses
 Forth (programming language)
 Foundation for Research & Technology – Hellas, a research centre in Greece

See also 

 Fort (disambiguation)
 Fourth (disambiguation)
 Sally Forth (disambiguation)
 Firth of Forth, an estuary in Scotland
 Islands of the Forth